Live at the Roxy Club is a live album by punk band Sham 69, recorded at the Roxy and released in 1990 (see 1990 in music).

Track listing
 "Rip Off" - 2:03
 "Ulster Boy" - 2:51
 "Borstal Breakout" - 2:11
 "Everybody's Innocent" - 2:19
 "Angels with Dirty Faces" - 2:31
 "Who Gives a Damn" - 3:25
 "That's Life" - 2:20
 "Tell Us the Truth" - 2:43
 "Day Tripper" - 3:31
 "Questions and Answers" - 3:29
 "If the Kids Are United" - 3:31

References 

Sham 69 live albums
1990 live albums